Morombe Airport is an airport in Morombe, Madagascar .

References

Airports in Madagascar
Atsimo-Andrefana